Erdemli Pine Groove is a nature park in Turkey. It is also called "Talat Göktepe Groove" to commemorate Talat Göktepe a former director of Forestry in Çanakkale who died while fighting against forest fire in 1994. It lies between the Turkish state highway  and the Mediterranean Sea coast.

It was declared a picnic place in 1962 and a nature park in 2011.

The coastal part is a sandy beach. There are some sand dunes on the beach. The back part is a groove. Most of the trees are Turkish pine (Pinus brutia), Umbrella pine (Sciadopitys) and myrtle (Myrtus).

References

Nature parks in Turkey
Beaches of Turkey
2011 establishments in Turkey
Parks in Mersin Province
Erdemli District
Tourist attractions in Mersin Province